Matrix remodeling associated 7 is a protein that in humans is encoded by the MXRA7 gene found on chromosome 17.
 Loss-of-function studies performed in MXRA7-deficient mice, in line with other types of data suggested that this gene was involved in multiple physiological or pathological processes.

References